Lee Rich (December 19, 1918 – May 24, 2012) was an American film and television producer, who won the 1973 Outstanding Drama Series Emmy award for The Waltons as the producer. He is also known as the co-founder and former chairman of Lorimar Television.

Among the five Emmy nominated programs Rich produced were the series Dallas and Knots Landing.

Early life and education
Rich was born in Cleveland, Ohio on December 19, 1918. His parents were Morris Richtaller and Anna Neminsky, both Jewish.  His mother was born in Tetiev, Ukraine.  He earned a marketing degree from Ohio University in Athens, Ohio.

Career
Rich began his career in advertising and ultimately became an industry executive.

He served in the Navy as a lieutenant in World War II, and then returned to advertising in New York, where he rose to senior vice president and a member of the board of Benton & Bowles.

As the ad agency middleman between product company sponsors and television producers, he was involved with The Andy Griffith Show, Make Room for Daddy, The Edge of Night, Gomer Pyle, U.S.M.C., and The Dick Van Dyke Show.

Rich left Benton & Bowles in 1965 to partner with the Mirisch Co. and form Mirisch-Rich Productions. There he produced The Rat Patrol.

In 1969, he, Merv Adelson, and Irwin Molasky formed Lorimar Productions. Its first production was The Homecoming: A Christmas Story (1971), a television film which led to Lorimar producing the series it inspired, The Waltons, featuring the same characters. The series ran on CBS from 1972 to 1981. Rich also co-produced the short-lived 1977 CBS espionage drama Hunter. Lorimar's biggest hit was the primetime soap Dallas, which ran from 1978 to 1991. In regards to the famous Dallas storyline “Who shot J.R.?” in which Larry Hagman’s character is fired upon in the 1979-80 season finale in March and the assailant is not revealed until the following November, only Rich and writer-director Leonard Katzman knew which of three previously shot endings would be used.

After leaving Lorimar in 1986, Rich joined MGM/UA Communications. For two years he was the chairman and chief executive of MGM.

Personal life
Rich married American actress Pippa Scott in 1964, having three children together before they divorced in 1983, though they maintained a friendship until his death. Later Rich had two other children with his second wife, Angela Rich.

Death
Rich died on May 24, 2012, at the age of 93 in Los Angeles, California from lung cancer.

Filmography
He was a producer in all films unless otherwise noted.

Film

Television

Production manager

Thanks

References

External links

 
 Image of Robert L. Jacks, Michael Learned, Richard Thomas and Lee Rich with their Emmys for "The Waltons," Los Angeles, California, 1973. Los Angeles Times Photographic Archive (Collection 1429). UCLA Library Special Collections, Charles E. Young Research Library, University of California, Los Angeles.

1918 births
2012 deaths
American film studio executives
Metro-Goldwyn-Mayer executives
United States Navy sailors
United States Navy personnel of World War II